The World's 25 Most Endangered Primates is a list of highly endangered primate species selected and published by the International Union for Conservation of Nature (IUCN) Species Survival Commission (SSC) Primate Specialist Group (PSG), the International Primatological Society (IPS), Global Wildlife Conservation (GWC), and Bristol Zoological Society (BZS).  The IUCN/SSC PSG worked with Conservation International (CI) to start the list in 2000, but in 2002, during the 19th Congress of the International Primatological Society, primatologists reviewed and debated the list, resulting in the 2002–2004 revision and the endorsement of the IPS.  The publication was a joint project between the three conservation organizations until the 2012–2014 list when BZS was added as a publisher. The 2018–2020 list was the first time Conservation International was not among the publishers, replaced instead by GWC.  The list has been revised every two years following the biannual Congress of the IPS.  Starting with the 2004–2006 report, the title changed to "Primates in Peril: The World's 25 Most Endangered Primates".  That same year, the list began to provide information about each species, including their conservation status and the threats they face in the wild.  The species text is written in collaboration with experts from the field, with 60 people contributing to the 2006–2008 report and 85 people contributing to the 2008–2010 report.  The 2004–2006 and 2006–2008 reports were published in the IUCN/SSC PSG journal Primate Conservation,, since then they have been published as independent publications.

The 25 species on the 2018–2020 list are distributed between 32 countries.  The country with the most species on the list is Madagascar with five species, Indonesia, Brazil, Ghana, and Cote d'Ivoire each have three. The list is broken into four distinct regions: the island of Madagascar, the continent of Africa, the continent of Asia including the islands of Indonesia, and the Neotropics (Central and South America).

The purpose of the list, according to Russell Mittermeier, the president of CI, is "to highlight those [primate species] that are most at risk, to attract the attention of the public, to stimulate national governments to do more, and especially to find the resources to implement desperately needed conservation measures."  Species are selected for the list based on two primary reasons: extremely small population sizes and very rapid drops in numbers.  These reasons are heavily influenced by habitat loss and hunting, the two greatest threats primates face.  More specifically, threats listed in the report include deforestation due to slash-and-burn agriculture, clearing for pasture or farmland, charcoal production, firewood production, illegal logging, selective logging, mining, land development, and cash crop production; forest fragmentation; small population sizes; live capture for the exotic pet trade; and hunting for bushmeat and traditional medicine. Twelve species were dropped for the 2018-2020 list, Mittermeier notes this was not because their situation has improved but instead to focus attention on other species that are also have "bleak prospects for their survival.

Key

Current list

Former list members

With each new publication, species are both added and removed from the list.  In some cases, removal from the list signifies improvement for the species.  With the publication of the 2006–2008 list, four species were removed because of increased conservation efforts: the black lion tamarin (Leontopithecus chrysopygus), golden lion tamarin (Leontopithecus rosalia), mountain gorilla (Gorilla beringei beringei), and Perrier's sifaka (Propithecus perrieri).  In 2008, the black lion tamarin went from critically endangered to endangered and the golden lion tamarin was similarly promoted in 2003 after three decades of collaborative conservation efforts by zoos and other institutions.  Well-protected species such as these still have very small populations, and due to deforestation, new habitat is still needed for their long-term survival.  The Hainan black crested gibbon (Nomascus hainanus), which was removed from the 2008–2010 list, still has fewer than 20 individuals left, but significant efforts to protect it are now being made.  Mittermeier claimed in 2007 that all 25 species could be elevated off the list within five to ten years if conservation organizations had the necessary resources.

Unlike the changes in the 2006–2008 report, not all species were removed from the 2008–2010 list due to improvement in their situation.  Instead, new species were added to bring attention to other closely related species with very small populations that are also at risk of extinction. For example, the highly endangered eastern black crested gibbon (Nomascus nasutus) replaced the Hainan black crested gibbon.  The Javan slow loris (Nycticebus javanicus) replaced the Horton Plains slender loris (Loris tardigradus nycticeboides) because the former has been hit the hardest of Asian lorises, all of which are declining rapidly due primarily to capture for the exotic pet trade, as well as use in traditional medicines and forest loss.  In another case, the brown-headed spider monkey (Ateles fusciceps fusciceps) was omitted from the list since no spokesperson could be found for the species.  The same approach was taken with the 2012–2014 list.

List history

With the exception of the 2000–2002 publication, which was written collaboratively by the IUCN/SSC PSG and CI, the list has been revised every two years following the biannual Congress of the IPS. The 2002–2004 list resulted from the 19th Congress of the IPS in Beijing, China; the 2004–2006 list followed the 20th Congress of the IPS, held in Torino, Italy; the 2006–2008 list after the 21st Congress in Entebbe, Uganda; the 2008–2010 list followed the 22nd Congress held in Edinburgh, UK; the 2010-2012 list followed the 23rd Congress in Kyoto, Japan; the 2012–2014 list after the 24th Congress in Cancún, Mexico; the 2014–2016 list after the 25th Congress in Hanoi, Vietnam; the 2016–2018 list after the 26th Congress in Chicago, US; the 2018–2020 list after the 27th Congress in Nairobi, Kenya; and the 2022–2023 list after the 28th Congress in Quito, Ecuador.

The 2008 IUCN Red List of Threatened Species offered assessments of 634 primate taxa, of which 303 (47.8%) were listed as threatened (vulnerable, endangered, or critically endangered).  A total of 206 primate species were ranked as either critically endangered or endangered, 54 (26%) of which have been included at least once in The World's 25 Most Endangered Primates since 2000.

See also

 The world's 100 most threatened species
 List of primates by population

Notes

References

External links
 IUCN Primate Specialist Group's Special Reports containing the latest and historic reports.

Endangered species
Environmental reports
International Union for Conservation of Nature
Lists of placental mammals
Primates, status
Primate conservation